Emanoul Aghassian (anglicized as Emmanuel "Mike" Agassi; December 25, 1930 – September 24, 2021) was an Iranian Olympic boxer and the father and coach of American tennis player Andre Agassi. He represented Iran at the 1948 and 1952 Summer Olympics.

Biography
Agassi was born in Salmas, Pahlavi Iran to Assyrian and Armenian parents (however in his own words, his father, David Agassi, was a Ukrainian Armenian from Kiev and mother was Armenian from the Ottoman Empire). He was raised in a Christian household in Tehran, Iran's capital. One of his ancestors had changed his surname from Aghassian to Agassi to avoid Ottoman persecution. 

Agassi was first exposed to tennis by American and British servicemen. He represented Iran as a boxer in the 1948 and 1952 Summer Olympics, losing in the first round both times. His trainer was the retired Polish-German boxer Hans Ziglarski.

He followed his brother Samuel to Chicago in 1952, and changed his name to "Mike Agassi". Less than a month after graduating from Roosevelt University, he met Elizabeth Dudley through a common friend. They married at a Methodist church in Chicago's North Side on August 19, 1959. When a friend offered Agassi a job at the Tropicana Hotel, the couple moved to Las Vegas with their two-year-old daughter Rita and eight-day-old son Phillip in October 1962; daughter Tamara (Tami) was born in 1967 and Andre in 1970.

Agassi described Rita, Phillip, and Tami as "guinea pigs" in the development of the methods he used to mold Andre into a world-class player. In 1984, Rita, having rebelled against her father's 5,000-balls-a-day-regimen, married Pancho Gonzales. In his autobiography Open, Andre recalled Mike and Steffi Graf's father Peter nearly coming to blows arguing over whether Andre or Steffi had the superior backhand technique when Mike showed Peter the machine he built to fire tennis balls at Andre and his siblings.

Mike Agassi's autobiography The Agassi Story was published in 2004. He died on September 24, 2021, at the age of 90, in Las Vegas.

1948 Olympic results
Below is the record of Emmanuel Agassi, an Iranian bantamweight boxer, who competed at the 1948 London Olympics:

 Round of 32: Lost to Alvaro Vicente (Spain) on points

See also 
Boxing at the 1952 Summer Olympics
Boxing at the 1948 Summer Olympics

References

1930 births
2021 deaths
Boxers at the 1948 Summer Olympics
Boxers at the 1952 Summer Olympics
Olympic boxers of Iran
Iranian people of Armenian descent
Iranian Assyrian people
Iranian emigrants to the United States
Iranian male boxers
American male boxers
Armenian male boxers
Sportspeople from Las Vegas
People from Salmas
Iranian Christians
Armenian Apostolic Christians
American tennis coaches
American people of Armenian descent
American people of Iranian-Assyrian descent
Roosevelt University alumni
Bantamweight boxers
Andre Agassi